Air fresheners are consumer products that typically emit fragrance and are used in homes or commercial interiors such as restrooms, foyers, hallways, vestibules and other smaller indoor areas, as well as larger areas such as hotel lobbies, auto dealerships, medical facilities, public arenas and other large interior spaces. Car fresheners are used in automobiles. As a source of odors, specific deodorizing blocks are made for toilets and urinals. 

There are many different methods and brands of air fresheners. Some of the different types of air fresheners include electric fan air fresheners, gravity drip hygiene odor control cleaning systems, passive non-mechanical evaporating aroma diffusers, metered aerosol time-operated mist dispensers, sprays, candles, oils, gels, beads, and plug-ins. 

Some air fresheners contain chemicals that provoke allergy and asthma symptoms or are toxic. Air freshening is not only limited to modern day sprays, air freshening also can involve the use of organic and everyday house hold items. Although air fresheners are primarily used for odor elimination, some people use air fresheners for the pleasant odors they emit.

History
Fragrances have been used to mask odors since antiquity. A variety of compounds have been used over the past two millennia for their abilities to create pleasant aromas or eliminate unpleasant odors.

The first modern air freshener was introduced in 1948. Its function was based on a military technology for dispensing insecticides and adapted into a pressurized spray using a chlorofluorocarbon (CFC) propellant. The product delivered a fine mist of aroma compounds that would remain suspended in the air for an extended period of time. This type of product became the industry standard and air freshener sales experienced tremendous growth. In the 1950s, many companies began to add chemicals that counteract odors to their fragrance formulas. These chemicals, intended to neutralize or destroy odors, included unsaturated esters, pre-polymers, and long-chain aldehydes.

In the 1980s, the air freshener market shifted away from aerosols, due to concerns over the destruction of the ozone layer by chlorofluorocarbons (CFCs). Many other air freshener delivery methods have become popular since, including under the seat wafer air fresheners, scented candles, reed diffusers, potpourri, and heat release products.

Basic principles

The control of odors is addressed by five classes of mechanisms;

 Adsorption: Adsorbents like zeolite, activated charcoal, or silica gel may be used to remove odors.
 Oxidation: ozone, hydrogen peroxide, peroxide, chlorine, chlorate and other oxidizing agents can be used to oxidize and remove organic sources of odors from surfaces and, in the case of ozone, from the air as well.
 Air sanitizer: Odors caused by airborne bacterial activity can be removed by air sanitizers that inactivate bacteria.
 Surfactants and soaps 
 Masking: Overwhelming an odor with another odor by any of the means described above.
Delivery of the above air freshener mechanisms falls into two broad categories: continuous action and instant action. Continuous action products include scented candles and devices which use a candle flame or some other heat source to heat and vaporize a fragrance formulation, incense burners, wall plug-ins which either use piezoelectric technology to aerosolize fragrance or heat to vaporize it, fragrance impregnated gels which release fragrance as the gel evaporates sometimes with the help of an electric fan, wick and reed diffusers which release fragrance by evaporation from fragrance-soaked wicks or wooden reeds; and fragrance impregnated materials like floor wax, paper, plastics, wood which release fragrance by off gassing; and lastly nebulization systems which convert liquid fragrances into a vapor in a cold process without the use of heat.

Instant action systems are mainly aerosol sprays, or atomizers. The aerosol spray uses a propellant and fragrance packaged under pressure in a sealed metal or glass container with a valve which is opened by pressing down a button which contains a spray nozzle – the actuator. When the container's valve is opened by pressing the actuator, fragrance is forced through the spray nozzle located inside the actuator to create a mist of droplets containing fragrance. These droplets are 30 to 50 micrometres in diameter. The atomizer is a glass, metal or plastic container of fragrance which operates in a similar fashion except that the actuator is a pump which when pressed a few times creates the pressure to aspirate the fragrance from the container through a tube into the actuator and spray nozzle. The mist created contains droplets 50 to 150 micrometres in diameter. A recently developed type of aerosol packages a plastic bag of fragrance into a can. The bag is attached to the valve/actuator/spray nozzle and sealed in the can surrounded by air under pressure. When the actuator is pressed, the valve opens and the liquid forced through the nozzle by the pressure around the bag. This is called "bag-on-valve" technology.

Global retail sales of air care products were valued at more than $6 billion in 2006 and were forecasted to reach $7.3 billion by 2010.

Air fresheners introduce fragrance into the air of interior spaces either as droplets which transition to vapor, or as the molecules of fragrance ingredients directly evaporating from a source. Fragrance diffuses into the air to mask other odors or to introduce a specific odor.

Ingredients 
In addition to the adsorbents, oxidizers, surfactants, and disinfectants listed above, ingredients in air fresheners can include fragrances, aerosol propellants, preservatives, and solvents such as mineral oil or 2-butoxyethanol and other glycol ethers. As fragrances, air freshener preparations often include terpenes such as limonene. 

A report issued in 2005 by the Bureau Européen des Unions de Consommateurs (BEUC) found that many air freshener products emit allergens and toxic air pollutants including benzene, formaldehyde, terpenes, styrene, phthalate esters, and toluene.

In 2020 air fresheners (as well as cleaning solutions and products used to clean cars) will need to list any of their ingredients which are on California's list of 2,300 harmful chemicals, based on a California law passed in 2017. A California study in 2006 found that the prominent products of the reaction of terpenes found in air fresheners with ozone included formaldehyde, hydroxyl radical, and secondary ultrafine particles. It is not clear if manufacturers will need to list such chemicals which are not ingredients, but form when the air freshener is placed in the air.

Toxicity
Many air fresheners employ carcinogens, volatile organic compounds and known toxins such as phthalate esters in their formulas. A Natural Resources Defense Council (NRDC) study of 13 common household air fresheners found that most of the surveyed products contain chemicals that can aggravate asthma and affect reproductive development. The NRDC called for more rigorous supervision of the manufacturers and their products, which are widely assumed to be safe:

The study assessed scented sprays, gels, and plug-in air fresheners. Independent lab testing confirmed the presence of phthalates, or hormone-disrupting chemicals that may pose a particular health risk to babies and young children, in 12 of the 14 products—including those marked 'all natural.' None of the products had these chemicals listed on their labels.

On September 19, 2007, along with the Sierra Club, Alliance for Healthy Homes, and the National Center for Healthy Housing, the NRDC filed a petition with the U.S. Environmental Protection Agency and the Consumer Product Safety Commission to report the findings.

The University of Bristol's Avon Longitudinal Study of Parents and Children (ALSPAC) found that exposure to volatile organic compounds through frequent use of air fresheners and other aerosols in the home was found to correlate with increased earaches and diarrhea in infants, and with increased depression and headaches in their mothers.

In 2008, Anne C. Steinemann of the University of Washington published a study of top-selling air fresheners and laundry products. She found that all products tested gave off chemicals regulated as toxic or hazardous under federal laws, including carcinogens with no safe exposure level, but none of these chemicals were listed on any of the product labels or Material Safety Data Sheets. Chemicals included acetone, the active ingredient in paint thinner and nail-polish remover; chloromethane, a neurotoxicant and respiratory toxicant; and acetaldehyde and 1,4-dioxane, both carcinogens. A plug-in air freshener contained more than 20 different volatile organic compounds, with more than one-third classified as toxic or hazardous under federal laws. Even air fresheners called "organic," "green," or with "essential oils" emitted hazardous chemicals, including carcinogens.

In 2009, Stanley M. Caress of the University of West Georgia and Anne C. Steinemann of the University of Washington published results from two national epidemiological studies of health effects from exposure to air fresheners. They found that nearly 20 percent of the general population and 34 percent of asthmatics report headaches, breathing difficulties, or other health problems when exposed to air fresheners or deodorizers.

Research at the University of Colorado at Boulder revealed a probable mechanism for the carcinogenic effects of some types of air fresheners.

Maintaining air quality
Removing the source of an unpleasant odor will decrease the chance that people will smell it. Ventilation is also important to maintaining indoor air quality and can aid in eliminating unpleasant odors. Simple cleaners such as white vinegar and baking soda, as well as natural adsorbents like activated charcoal and zeolite, are effective at removing odors. Other solutions are bad smells removers that are adapted to different types of odor. The result is odor-free air that is also pollution-free and safer to breathe. Some house plants may also aid in the removal of toxic substances from the air in building interiors.

See also
 Deodorant
 Incense
 Little Trees car freshener
 Urinal deodorizer block
 Toilet rim block

Fragrances 
 Lyral
 Citronellal

References 
 

Cleaning products
Perfumes